WWTD-LD, virtual channel 49 (UHF digital channel 14), is a low-powered Dabl-affiliated television station licensed to Washington, D.C., United States. The station is owned by DC Broadcasting, Inc. which itself is wholly owned by Christopher Blair of Denver, Colorado.

History
The station was granted its initial construction permit in 1990. At the time, it was owned by Robert E. Kelly of Annandale, Virginia, and was licensed to Annapolis, Maryland with the callsign W63BP. The station never made it to air; the permit, initially scheduled to expire in January 1991, was extended multiple times through 1995. At that point, the FCC denied a further request for extension, the permit expired, and the station was deleted from the FCC database. The construction permit was again applied for and granted in 2001, and W63BP signed on October 31. Immediately, the station applied to move to channel 49 from the WRC-TV tower in northwest Washington; the construction permit was granted in February 2004. In 2005, Kelly sold both W63BP and dormant W61BY (now WRZB-LD) to DC Broadcasting, Inc. for $10.

Channel 49 went back on the air in 2006. It was the flagship station of the WUFO TV Network, which was on the air for nine months during 2007–2008. The network was funded and programmed by Mike Gravino.  The WUFO TV Network aired an eclectic mix of "alternative knowledge" programming, including information about UFOs, crop-circles, alternative history, new science, alternative religion, environmental and social activism, human potential and sci-fi, until August 10, 2008, when the network stopped over-the-air broadcasts.

WWTD-LP was then leased to Allbritton Communications Company, who turned it into an analog relay of local ABC affiliate WJLA in late October 2008.  However, that lease and the ABC transmissions ended on February 9, 2009. After WJLA's lease on WWTD expired, WWTD went dark.

Before the digital transition, WWTD-LP was granted a construction permit for a corresponding digital signal on channel 38. The station was later displaced by WMAR to channel 14, as any low-powered station must move if a full-powered station wants its channel allocation. WWTD-LP flash-cut to digital as WWTD-LD on July 19, 2011, in order to reuse its existing antenna and transmitter. Through the use of PSIP, digital television receivers display as channels 49.1 to 49.6.

The station added two channels from Luken Communications beginning February 1, 2015: Retro TV on channel 49.4 and Rev'n on 49.5.

Digital television

Digital channels
The station's digital channel is multiplexed:

References

External links

Television channels and stations established in 1990
Low-power television stations in the United States
WTD-LD